Langley is a town in Mayes County, Oklahoma, United States. The population was 819 at the 2010 census.

History
Langley, still located at its original site, is on State Highway 82 at the west end of the Pensacola Dam, which is on the National Register of Historic Places listings in Mayes County, Oklahoma.  The dam holds back the  Grand Lake o' the Cherokees (aka Grand Lake). Dam construction started in 1935.  Cliff Bogle, the original owner in the area, divided his land into lots, and in 1937 the Town was established with a public dedication and drawing for free lots.   The Town was named for Oklahoma State Senator J. Howard Langley.  Langley incorporated on November 20, 1939, and a post office was established on January 20, 1939.  The Dam was completed in 1941, and the town began to promote itself to the recreation industry.  The Dam itself is on the National Register of Historic Places listings in Mayes County, Oklahoma.

Geography
Langley is located at  (36.468980, -95.049670).

Demographics

As of 2010 the population of Langley was 819.  The racial and ethnic composition of the population was 69.8% white, 0.7% African American, 21.0% Native American, 0.9% Asian, 0.1% Pacific Islander, 0.9% from some other race and 6.6% from two or more races.  3.7% of the population was Hispanic or Latino of any race.

As of the census of 2000, there were 669 people, 274 households, and 187 families residing in the town. There were 360 housing units at an average density of 291.9 per square mile (113.0/km2). The racial makeup of the town was 67.41% White, 0.45% African American, 20.03% Native American, 0.30% Asian, 2.24% from other races, and 9.57% from two or more races. Hispanic or Latino of any race were 4.04% of the population.

There were 274 households, out of which 27.0% had children under the age of 18 living with them, 55.5% were married couples living together, 9.1% had a female householder with no husband present, and 31.4% were non-families. 27.0% of all households were made up of individuals, and 14.2% had someone living alone who was 65 years of age or older. The average household size was 2.38 and the average family size was 2.88.

In the town, the population was spread out, with 22.7% under the age of 18, 7.9% from 18 to 24, 24.2% from 25 to 44, 26.0% from 45 to 64, and 19.1% who were 65 years of age or older. The median age was 41 years. For every 100 females, there were 100.3 males. For every 100 females age 18 and over, there were 102.7 males.

The median income for a household in the town was $22,500, and the median income for a family was $26,250. Males had a median income of $26,250 versus $16,731 for females. The per capita income for the town was $11,542. About 22.7% of families and 29.3% of the population were below the poverty line, including 49.0% of those under age 18 and 20.5% of those age 65 or over.

References

Towns in Mayes County, Oklahoma
Towns in Oklahoma